The Representation of the People Act 1983 (c. 2) is an Act of the Parliament of the United Kingdom. It changed the British electoral process in the following ways:

 Amended the Representation of the People Act 1969.
 Stated that a convicted person cannot vote at any parliamentary or local election whilst in prison.
 Laid down the appeals process in local elections

The Act also regulates how political parties and people acting on their behalf are to behave before and during an election.

Election expenses
Sections 72 to 90 control the total election expenses that can be spent on behalf of a candidate.

During the time limit of the election, all money spent on the promotion of a candidate must be authorised by his election agent.  This includes the cost of holding public meetings, organising public displays, issuing advertisements, circulars, or otherwise presenting the candidate's views and the extent or nature of his backing or disparaging another candidate.  It does not include travel expenses from home or similar personal expenses.

The expenses limit for the campaign (which is enforceable due to it all having to be authorised by one person) is £100,000 for a parliamentary by-election, but is approximately £5,483 plus either 6.2p or 4.6p for every registered voter in the district.

Publicity at parliamentary elections
Sections 91 to 94 entitle the candidate to one free mailshot of election material to all voters in the constituency.  It is also illegal to print fake polling cards.

Election meetings
Sections 95 to 98 entitle the candidate to hold public meetings free of charge in schools and other public buildings in the constituency, and pay only the cost price for making the rooms available.

Agency by election officials and canvassing by police officers
Sections 99 makes it illegal for officers in charge of administering an election to be involved in any of the election campaigns.

Section 100 forbids a police officer from canvassing in any election which overlaps with their police area.

Conveyance of voters to and from the poll
Sections 101 to 105 made it illegal to hire or lend taxis and buses to give lifts of voters to the ballot box.  These sections were repealed by Political Parties, Elections and Referendums Act 2000.

Other illegal practices, payments, employments or hirings

False statements as to candidates
Section 106 makes it illegal for any person to publish any false statement of fact in relation to the candidate's personal character or conduct, unless he or she can show that he had reasonable grounds for believing that statement to be true. Similar provisions in previous laws have made this illegal since 1895.  It is also illegal to publish a false statement of a candidate's withdrawal from an election.

In September 2007 Miranda Grell was found guilty under this section when she made allegations of paedophilia and having sex with teenage boys against her gay opponent during the 2006 United Kingdom local elections.

In November 2010, Labour MP Phil Woolas was found by an electoral court to have breached section 106. The judges ruled that a by-election for the seat should be held. Woolas said that he would apply for a judicial review into the ruling. In a statement released through his lawyer, Woolas stated that "this election petition raised fundamental issues about the freedom to question and criticise politicians" and that it "will inevitably chill political speech". The judicial review failed to overturn the ruling of the election court.

In June 2015 the independent candidate in Mid Bedfordshire, Tim Ireland, lodged an appeal against the result at the general election, accusing Nadine Dorries of breaches of section 106 by making false statements about his character. The petition was rejected by the High Court of Justice because it was served at Dorries' constituency office and not her home address.

Corrupt withdrawal from candidature
Section 107 makes it illegal to bribe a candidate to withdraw from an election.

Premises not to be used as committee rooms
Section 108 made it illegal to hire a room in a pub for holding a campaign committee meeting.  This section was repealed by the Political Parties, Elections and Referendums Act 2000.

Payments for exhibition of election notices
Section 109 prohibits hiring special advertising spaces (e.g. on the sides of houses) for the display of campaign posters (hiring ordinary advertising billboards used for regular advertising is permitted).

Details to appear on election publications
Section 110 states that any material, leaflet or advertisement for a candidate in an election must include the names and addresses of the printer, the promoter, and the person on behalf of whom the material is being published.

In December 2008 a Liverpool City Liberal Democrats councillor was found guilty under this section for delivering leaflets during the 2007 United Kingdom local elections purporting to be on behalf of The United Socialist Party (but lacking the necessary names and addresses) attacking the Labour candidate for crossing a picket line during a strike, and accusing his wife (who is a sitting councillor) of leaving council meetings early to learn lap dancing.

Parliamentary election rules
Schedule 1 of the Act lays out in complete form the rules for running a parliamentary election and how the nomination papers should be handled.

See also
 Corrupt practices
 Reform Acts
 Representation of the People Act

References

External links

United Kingdom Acts of Parliament 1983
Representation of the People Acts